The Red Man's View (also cited The Redman's View) is a 1909 American short silent Western film directed by D. W. Griffith and shot in New York state. Prints of the film exist in the film archives of the Museum of Modern Art and the Library of Congress. According to the New York Dramatic Mirror, the film is about "the helpless Indian race as it has been forced to recede before the advancing white, and as such is full of poetic sentiment". In his 2003 publication The Invention of the Western Film: A Cultural History of the Genre's First Half Century, film historian Scott Simon observes that "the film's title works out to mean 'The Red Man's Point of View', and for all the film's difficulty in making drama from a long, passive march, there's nothing like The Red Man's View in Hollywood until John Ford's Cheyenne Autumn more than fifty years later".

A remake starring Daniel Baldwin, Saginaw Grant, Booboo Stewart, Elaine Miles, Michael Spears, and Crystal Lightning was scheduled to be released in 2017.

Cast
 Owen Moore as Silver Eagle
 James Kirkwood as Silver Eagle's Father, the Tribal Spokesman
 Kate Bruce as Indian
 Charles Craig as Conqueror
 Frank Evans as Conqueror
 Edith Haldeman as Indian
 Ruth Hart as Indian
 Arthur V. Johnson as Conqueror
 Henry Lehrman as Conqueror
 W. Chrystie Miller as Indian
 George Nichols as Conqueror
 Anthony O'Sullivan as Conqueror
 Alfred Paget
 Lottie Pickford as Minnewanna
 Billy Quirk as Conqueror
 Mack Sennett as Conqueror
 Charles West as Conqueror
 Dorothy West as Indian

See also
 List of American films of 1909
 1909 in film
 D. W. Griffith filmography

References

External links
 
 The Red Man's View on YouTube
 

1909 films
1909 Western (genre) films
1909 short films
American silent short films
American black-and-white films
Articles containing video clips
Films directed by D. W. Griffith
Films about Native Americans
Films with screenplays by Frank E. Woods
Silent American Western (genre) films
1900s American films